The 75th parallel north is a circle of latitude that is 75 degrees north of the Earth's equatorial plane, in the Arctic. It crosses the Atlantic Ocean, Europe, Asia, the Arctic Ocean and North America. 

At this latitude the sun is visible for 24 hours, 0 minutes during the summer solstice and nautical twilight during the winter solstice.

Around the world
Starting at the Prime Meridian and heading eastwards, the parallel 75° north passes through:

{| class="wikitable plainrowheaders"
! scope="col" width="125" | Co-ordinates
! scope="col" | Country, territory or sea
! scope="col" | Notes
|-valign="top"
| style="background:#b0e0e6;" | 
! scope="row" style="background:#b0e0e6;" | Atlantic Ocean
| style="background:#b0e0e6;" | Greenland Sea Norwegian Sea
|-
| style="background:#b0e0e6;" | 
! scope="row" style="background:#b0e0e6;" | Barents Sea
| style="background:#b0e0e6;" |
|-
| 
! scope="row" | 
| Novaya Zemlya - Severny Island
|-
| style="background:#b0e0e6;" | 
! scope="row" style="background:#b0e0e6;" | Kara Sea
| style="background:#b0e0e6;" | Passing just south of the Arkticheskiy Institut Islands, 
|-
| 
! scope="row" | 
| Taymyr Peninsula, passing through Lake Taymyr
|-
| style="background:#b0e0e6;" | 
! scope="row" style="background:#b0e0e6;" | Laptev Sea
| style="background:#b0e0e6;" |
|-valign="top"
| 
! scope="row" | 
| New Siberian Islands - Kotelny Island and Bunge Land
|-
| style="background:#b0e0e6;" | 
! scope="row" style="background:#b0e0e6;" | East Siberian Sea
| style="background:#b0e0e6;" | Passing just south of Faddeyevsky Island, 
|-
| 
! scope="row" | 
| New Siberian Islands - New Siberia
|-
| style="background:#b0e0e6;" | 
! scope="row" style="background:#b0e0e6;" | East Siberian Sea
| style="background:#b0e0e6;" |
|-
| style="background:#b0e0e6;" | 
! scope="row" style="background:#b0e0e6;" | Arctic Ocean
| style="background:#b0e0e6;" |
|-
| style="background:#b0e0e6;" | 
! scope="row" style="background:#b0e0e6;" | Beaufort Sea
| style="background:#b0e0e6;" |
|-
| style="background:#b0e0e6;" | 
! scope="row" style="background:#b0e0e6;" | M'Clure Strait
| style="background:#b0e0e6;" |
|-
| 
! scope="row" | 
| Northwest Territories - Melville Island 
|-
| style="background:#b0e0e6;" | 
! scope="row" style="background:#b0e0e6;" | Liddon Gulf
| style="background:#b0e0e6;" |
|-valign="top"
| 
! scope="row" | 
| Northwest Territories - Melville Island Nunavut - Melville Island
|-
| style="background:#b0e0e6;" | 
! scope="row" style="background:#b0e0e6;" | Viscount Melville Sound
| style="background:#b0e0e6;" | Passing just south of Byam Martin Island, Nunavut, 
|-
| 
! scope="row" | 
| Nunavut - Bathurst Island 
|-
| style="background:#b0e0e6;" | 
! scope="row" style="background:#b0e0e6;" | McDougall Sound
| style="background:#b0e0e6;" |
|-
| 
! scope="row" | 
| Nunavut - Cornwallis Island
|-
| style="background:#b0e0e6;" | 
! scope="row" style="background:#b0e0e6;" | Wellington Channel
| style="background:#b0e0e6;" |
|-
| 
! scope="row" | 
| Nunavut - Devon Island and Philpots Island
|-
| style="background:#b0e0e6;" | 
! scope="row" style="background:#b0e0e6;" | Baffin Bay
| style="background:#b0e0e6;" |
|-
| 
! scope="row" | 
| Kjer Glacier
|-
| 
! scope="row" | 
| Grandjean Fjord and Kuhn Island (King Christian X Land)
|-
| style="background:#b0e0e6;" | 
! scope="row" style="background:#b0e0e6;" | Atlantic Ocean
| style="background:#b0e0e6;" | Hochstetter Bay
|-
| 
! scope="row" | 
| Shannon Island
|-
| style="background:#b0e0e6;" | 
! scope="row" style="background:#b0e0e6;" | Atlantic Ocean
| style="background:#b0e0e6;" | Greenland Sea
|-
|}

See also
74th parallel north
76th parallel north

n75
Geography of the Arctic